The Disk'O (also known as Skater or Surf's Up) is a type of flat ride manufactured by Zamperla of Italy. The ride is a larger version of a Rockin' Tug, also manufactured by Zamperla.

Versions

Ride
On a traditional Disk'O, Mega Disk'O or Disk'O Coaster, riders sit on a circular platform with outward-facing seats. On a Skater or a Skater Coaster, riders sit on a rectangular platform with inwards facing seats. On a Surf's Up, riders stand on a rectangular platform. Regardless of the model, the ride experience is very similar. The platform moves back and forth along a halfpipe track while spinning. A Disk'O Coaster or a Skater Coaster both feature a small hill in the middle of the halfpipe.

Installations

References

External links

Zamperla Rides

Amusement rides
Zamperla
Italian inventions